Edinaman Secondary School is a co-ed second cycle institution at Elmina in Ghana. It was established on January 19, 1978, and started offering educational services from the Elmina Castle.

References

Educational institutions established in 1978
Elmina
High schools and secondary schools in Ghana
1978 establishments in Ghana